Bell Park Sport & Recreation Club, nicknamed the Dragons, is a sports club based in Bell Park, Victoria. The club's Australian rules football and netball teams currently play in the Geelong League. Bell Park home venue is the Bell Park Recreation Reserve.

Apart from football and netball, Bell Park has a cricket team.

History
In 1958 they were founded as an under 15 team, then in 1959 they also entered an under 18 side.
The first senior side was fielded in 1960 in the Geelong & DFL, Jarman Cup  division.

When the Geelong Football League was formed in 1979, Bell Park was one of the 10 clubs that broke away from the Geelong & District Football League. The city and country clubs of the old GDFL were divided into the major league competition of the GFL and the minor league GDFL.

In 2002, Ken Hinkley took up the role of senior coach and oversaw a premiership in 2003.

Premierships
 1969, 1970, 1984, 1991, 2003, 2011

List of VFL / AFL listed players

 Nathan Saunders – 
 Jimmy Bartel – 
 Fraser Murphy – 
 Ray Sarcevic -

Bibliography
 Cat Country: History of Football In The Geelong Region – John Stoward –

References

External links

 Official website

Geelong Football League clubs
1958 establishments in Australia
Geelong & District Football League clubs
Sports clubs established in 1958
Netball teams in Geelong
Australian club cricket teams
Cricket clubs established in 1958
Australian rules football clubs established in 1958
Australian rules football clubs in Geelong